Imengine, headquartered in Atlanta, Georgia, is an American entertainment production company. The company currently produces work for film, television, video games, anime, comic books, manga, graphic novels, and websites. Imengine Entertainment, LLC was founded in 2005 by Andrew Collins and holds satellite offices in New York and London.

On the web
Imengine.net

Entertainment companies of the United States
Companies based in Atlanta
Companies established in 2005